Chilia River may refer to the following rivers in Romania:

 Chilia River (Bistrița), a tributary of the Bistriţa River
 Chilia River (Nemțișor), a tributary of the Nemțișor River

See also
 Chilia branch, a distributary of the Danube
 Chilia (disambiguation)